Chris Obst (born 9 October 1979) is a former Australian rules footballer who played with Hawthorn in the Australian Football League (AFL).

Obst was drafted from the Western Jets in the TAC Cup but came from Melton originally. A half back, he was taken by Hawthorn at pick 19 in the 1997 National Draft. He struggled with injuries while at Hawthorn and never managed to play more than six games in a season. In 2001, he was a member of Box Hill's premiership. He was picked up by the Sydney Swans in the 2002 Rookie Draft but would not play a senior game for the club and was delisted at the end of the year. While with the Swans, he began playing for their VFL affiliate Port Melbourne, and he remained there after being delisted, playing over 100 games and captaining the club.

References

External links
 
 

1979 births
Living people
Australian rules footballers from Victoria (Australia)
Hawthorn Football Club players
Port Melbourne Football Club players
Box Hill Football Club players
Melton Football Club players
Western Jets players